Emblemariopsis occidentalis, the Flagfin blenny, Blackfin blenny or the Redspine blenny, is a species of chaenopsid blenny found around the Bahamas, Brazil, and the Lesser Antilles, in the western Atlantic ocean.

References
 Stephens, J.S., Jr., 1970 (1 June) Seven new chaenopsid blennies from the western Atlantic. Copeia 1970 (no. 2): 280–309.

occidentalis
Fish of the Atlantic Ocean
Fish of the Lesser Antilles
Marine fauna of North America
Marine fauna of South America
Fish of Brazil
Fauna of the Bahamas
Taxa named by John S. Stephens Jr.
Fish described in 1970